No Commitments is a radio drama written by Simon Brett, originally broadcast on BBC Radio 4 and now on BBC Radio 4 Extra. It ran for 13 series, starting in 1992. The sitcom portrays the day-to-day lives of three very different sisters.  All 13 series are now available as audiobooks.

Main characters
Anna is the eldest and most level-headed of the three sisters. Having cared for her father for some years, on his death she inherited the family home. Generally happy and contented with life, she suddenly finds herself free to put herself first for once, now she genuinely has No Commitments, despite her sisters' belief that she requires their assistance in managing her personal life. She works as receptionist to Eddie, a misogynistic dentist.
Victoria lives out her rôle as the middle class housewife in Beckenham, a London suburb. With her dull long-suffering financial director husband Roger, and their three children, Emily, Harriet and Benjy, she tries to maintain the family's social reputation, at all costs. Emily (who over time grows from a child to a young mother) finds her aunt Anna a more sympathetic confidante than her mother. Of the other children, Harriet features once and Benjy is not heard from at all in the series.
Charlotte is the youngest sister, and longs to be a famous actress. Lacking somewhat in both talent and self-awareness, she stumbles from one small acting rôle to the next, finally finding a small amount of success in a little-known television soap opera. She seems to progress through serial lovers at about the same rate, often with the expectation that the casting couch will lead to the bed, or vice versa. She has one daughter, Gisele, the result of a brief marriage to an Australian actor, who has more success in her parents' profession after a period working for charities in Africa. Like Benjy, Gisele is never heard from directly.

Cast and crew

Regular cast
 Anna – Rosemary Leach
 Victoria
 Nicola Pagett (series 1–5)
 Angela Thorne (series 6–13)
 Charlotte
 Celia Imrie (series 1, 3–8, 10, 12)
 Josie Lawrence (series 2)
 Felicity Montagu (series 9, 11, 13)
 Roger
 Stephen Moore (series 1)
 Roger Lloyd-Pack (series 2)
 Jonathan Coy (series 3, 4, 12, 13)
 Bill Nighy (series 5, 6, 7, 8, 9, 10, 11)
 Eddie – James Greene
 Delia (series 1) – Maxine Audley
 Emily
 Lisa Coleman (series 2–4, 6–13)
 Natalie Walter (series 5)
 Nick – Kieran Hill (series 10–13)

Production
Music – Elizabeth Parker of the BBC Radiophonic Workshop
Producer
Paul Schlesinger (series 1, 2)
Anne Jobson (series 3, 4)
Maria Esposito (series 5, 6)
Simon Brett (series 10–13)

Episode list

External links
BBC Radio 4 website
britishcomedy.org.uk
radiolistings.co.uk
epguides.com

BBC Radio 4 programmes
BBC Radio comedy programmes
1992 radio programme debuts